Catherine Mary Inglese (December 16, 1958 – July 24, 2019) was an American college basketball coach who served as the head coach for women's basketball programs for a total of 27 years, at the University of Vermont, Boston College, and the University of Rhode Island.

Collegiate coaching
In 1983, Inglese became assistant basketball coach at the University of New Hampshire, a position she held for three years.

Inglese served as the head coach of the Vermont Catamounts women's basketball team at the University of Vermont for seven seasons, starting in 1986. She put together a string of 57 consecutive regular season wins over two seasons going 29–0 in 1992, and 28–0 in 1993. She posted a 120–74 overall record at Vermont.

Inglese was the head women's basketball coach for the Boston College Eagles women's basketball team at Boston College from May 1993 until April 2008. She posted eight 20-win seasons with the Eagles, with seven NCAA tournament appearances, including three trips to the "Sweet 16" (round-of-16). In 2004, the Eagles won a school record 27 games, capturing their first-ever Big East championship. Her team defeated number one seed Ohio State in the 2006 NCAA tournament. Inglese resigned her position at Boston College in April 2008, following a second-round exit from the ACC women's basketball tournament and a third-round exit from the Women's National Invitation Tournament (WNIT). Her overall record at Boston College was 273–129 (.604) in 15 seasons.

In April 2009, Inglese became head coach of the Rhode Island Rams women's basketball team at the University of Rhode Island. She coached the team for five seasons, compiling a record of 30–115 (.207). In March 2014, her contract was not renewed.

Inglese later worked at Fairleigh Dickinson University for two seasons (2017–18 and 2018–19), then was hired as an assistant coach at Hofstra University in June 2019.

USA Basketball

Inglese served as an assistant coach of the USA women's basketball team at the World University Games (also known as the Universiade) held in Izmir, Turkey, in August 2005, under head coach Kathy Delaney-Smith of Harvard. The US team played their first game against the Czech Republic and won, 88–64, with the 24-point margin in that contest being the closest any team would come to beating the US. The team then defeated South Africa, China, and Poland to advance to the quarterfinals. They then beat Chinese Taipei and Russia, each by more than 50 points, to advance to the title game with Serbia & Montenegro. The US won the championship, 79–63, finishing with a 7–0 record and winning the gold medal.

Head coaching record

|-style="background: #ffffdd;"
| colspan=6 align=center | Big East Conference

|-style="background: #ffffdd;"
| colspan=6 align=center | Atlantic Coast Conference

Source:

Coaching honors
 District I Coach of the Year (1991, 1992, 1993)
 National coach of the Year Finalist (1991, 1992, 1993)
 North Atlantic Conference Coach of the Year (1991, 1992, 1993)
 Big East Conference Coach of the Year (1999)
 New England Division I Coach of the Year (2004)

Source:

Personal life
Inglese graduated magna cum laude  from Southern Connecticut State University in 1980, and later earned a master of education in counseling from the University of New Hampshire in 1987.

She was an inductee of several halls of fame, including at Southern Connecticut State University, the University of Vermont, and Boston College.

Inglese suffered a traumatic brain injury in an apparent fall in a stairwell sustained on July 17, 2019. She later underwent surgery at North Shore University Hospital in Manhasset, New York. Inglese died from her injuries on July 24, 2019, at age 60.

References

Further reading

External links
Profile at bceagles.cstv.com via Wayback Machine
Profile at gorhody.com
Profile at gohofstra.com

1958 births
2019 deaths
Accidental deaths from falls
Accidental deaths in New York (state)
American women's basketball coaches
American women's basketball players
Basketball coaches from Connecticut
Basketball players from Connecticut
Boston College Eagles women's basketball coaches
College women's basketball players in the United States
People from Wallingford, Connecticut
Rhode Island Rams women's basketball coaches
Southern Connecticut State University alumni
Sportspeople from New Haven County, Connecticut
Vermont Catamounts women's basketball coaches